Fork Mountain may refer to:

 Fork Mountain (New York), a mountain in the Catskills
 Fork Mountain, Tennessee, a former coal mining camp in Morgan County
 Fork Mountain, Virginia, an unincorporated community in Botetourt County

See also 
 Mountain Fork, a river in western Arkansas